Şəfibəyli is a village in the Zangilan District of Azerbaijan.

History
The village was located in the Armenian-occupied territories surrounding Nagorno-Karabakh, coming under the control of ethnic Armenian forces in 1993 during the First Nagorno-Karabakh War.

The village subsequently became part of the self-proclaimed Republic of Artsakh as part of its Kashatagh Province and was renamed Khachadzor. 

It was recaptured by Azerbaijan during the 2020 Nagorno-Karabakh war on or around November 4, 2020.

References 

Populated places in Zangilan District